Nam Tae-yun (born 23 March 1998) is a South Korean sport shooter.

He participated at the 2018 ISSF World Shooting Championships.

References

External links

Living people
1998 births
South Korean male sport shooters
ISSF rifle shooters
Universiade silver medalists for South Korea
Universiade medalists in shooting
Medalists at the 2019 Summer Universiade
Shooters at the 2020 Summer Olympics
21st-century South Korean people